Lycodichthys is a genus of marine ray-finned fish belonging to the family Zoarcidae, the eelpouts. They are found in the Southern Ocean.

Taxonomy
Lycodichthys was first proposed as a monospecific genus in 1911 by the German zoologist  when he described L. antarcticus giving its type locality as the Gauss winter station on the coast of Kaiser Wilhelm II Land in Antarctica. The American ichthyologist Hugh Hamilton DeWitt described Rhigophila dearbornii in 1962 but in 1988 this taxon was reviwed by the South African based American ichthyologist M. Eric Anderson and reclassified as the second species in Lyodichthys, making Rhigophila as synonym of Lycodichthys. This genus is classified in the subfamily Lycodinae, one of four subfamilies in the family Zoarcidae, the eelpouts.

Etymology
Lycodichthys combines the name of the Northern genus Lycodes with ichthys, meaning "fish", as this genus closely resembles Lycodes in the shape of the body and fins.

Species
Lycodichthys contains the following species:

Characteristics
Lycodichthys eelpouts have robust bodies which have a depth which is equal to 8.4% to 12.7% of their standard length. They have firm, thick skin and both scales and the lateral line are present. Pelvic fins can be either present or absent. There are five suborbital bones and five pores on the head. The gill slit does not typically extend as far as the lower edge of the base of the pectoral fin. There are no vomerine or palatine teeth.

Distribution and habitat

References 

Lycodinae
Ray-finned fish genera